Bucklebury is a village and civil parish in West Berkshire, England, about  north-east of Newbury and  north of the A4 road. The parish has a population of 2,116, but the village is much smaller.

Toponymy
The place-name "Bucklebury" is first attested in the Domesday Book of 1086, where it appears as Borgeldeberie, which means "Burghild's fortified place or borough" ("Burghild" is a woman's name).

Geography

The parish of Bucklebury has three main parts. The original village is on the banks of the River Pang close to its three sources in the parish. The common is, under the Inclosure Acts, open to villagers only as commoners and privately owned. At the eastern boundary of the common is Chapel Row, incorporating local landmarks such as the Blade Bone public house, a doctors' surgery and a teashop.

The village of Upper Bucklebury became the parish's largest residential area in the late 20th century. Upper Bucklebury has a general store, a public house, a modern Church of England church, All Saints, and a Church of England primary school.

The hamlet of Marlston is also in the parish. It is mostly fields, with a smaller area of woodland.

History
Bucklebury was a royal manor owned by Edward the Confessor (reigned 1042–66). The village and parish church are recorded in the Domesday Book of 1086. Henry I (reigned 1100–35) granted Bucklebury to the Cluniac Reading Abbey, which retained it until it lost all its lands to the Crown with the Dissolution of the Monasteries in 1540.

Wooden bowl-making was "still carried on" in 1923 on or next to Bucklebury Common using its wood. Until 1950, such wood was also used by handle-maker Harry J. Wells. Over 100 tools used at his workshop at Heatherdene, Bucklebury Common are in the Museum of English Rural Life collection.

In the Second World War much of Bucklebury Common was cleared for the stationing of troops. Some of the concrete paths laid down still remain and are now used as bridleways.

Notable buildings

Parish church
The Church of England parish church of Saint Mary has a style consistent with being built in the second half of the 11th century. The ornate south doorway is late Norman and was added in about 1170. A north transept was added to the nave at the end of the 12th or beginning of the 13th century. Late in the 13th century, a second arch was added to turn the transept into a two-bay north aisle. One of the windows in the south wall of the nave was added in the 14th century.

In the 15th century, the nave and north aisle were lengthened westwards by adding a third bay, and new east and two new north windows were inserted in the north aisle. In the second half of the 15th century, the Perpendicular Gothic bell tower was added. The chancel was rebuilt in 1591 and the porch was added in 1603. The chancel was partly rebuilt again in 1705 and the porch has also been rebuilt. A vestry has also been added. The church contains tombs of the Winchcombe family. The whole structure is nationally listed for heritage/architecture in the highest category, Grade I.

The Rectory has an early 18th-century frontage. In 1966 the garden included two sculptures by Henry Moore: Draped Reclining Woman 1957–1958 and Reclining Figure (1961–1962).

Ministry and worship
The ecclesiastical parish has very similar boundaries to the civil (secular) parish and gives its name to a benefice of three churches. This reaches into two parishes to the east to provide six churches, each with its own style of worship. A late December carol service and separate Christmas Eve and Christmas Day communions are held. 2bsd is the collective name for the churches of Bucklebury, Bradfield and Stanford Dingley. The parishes of Bucklebury with Marlston, Bradfield and Stanford Dingley from a group of rural parishes with six very different church buildings architecturally as well.

Bucklebury House and estate
The 1,600–acre (647 ha) agricultural Bucklebury manor estate was confiscated from Reading Abbey at the Dissolution of the Monasteries in 1540 and granted to John Winchcombe (died 1557), who built himself a fine Elizabethan mansion. When it was owned by the Hartley family, a fire in 1830 destroyed the greater part of the house, which was later demolished. The parts left standing were the kitchen, with a huge fireplace, the brewhouse, and the stables, which had been rebuilt by Winchcombe's descendant-in-law, Lord Bolingbroke in the early 18th century, although on the stables is a date 1626 with the initials H. W. for Henry Winchcombe (died 1642). After the fire, the family built themselves a smaller house on the estate, eventually called Bucklebury Manor, but for the most part they lived on their Gloucestershire estates instead.

When the last of the Hartleys died in 1881, Bucklebury and the other family estates passed to four sisters: the Countess de Palatiano, Mrs Webley-Parry, Mrs Acreman White, and Mrs Charles Russell. Their families each became lords of the manor in turn and lived at the smaller Bucklebury Manor until 1957. In that year, Major Derrick Hartley Russell restored the remains of the old mansion to form the present Bucklebury House. His son, Willie, is the current lord of the manor.

Bucklebury Manor

This is a small Georgian country house on Pease Hill, which briefly served as the local manor house between 1906 and 1957. It is currently the home Michael and Carole Middleton, the parents of the Duchess of Cambridge.

Demography

In popular culture
In Tolkien's legendarium "Bucklebury Ferry" is run by Buckland Hobbits to Bucklebury, their main town, across the Brandywine river.

Notable residents
In birth order:
Henry St John, 1st Viscount Bolingbroke (1678–1751), politician and philosopher
Henry Octavius Coxe (1811–1881), librarian and scholar
George Palmer (1818–1897), proprietor of the Huntley & Palmers biscuit manufacturers
George William Palmer (1851–1913), Liberal Member of Parliament, son of George Palmer
George Lailey (1869–1958), last professional practitioner of the craft of bowl-turning using a pole lathe
Hutin Britton (1876–1965), actress
Robert Still (1910–1971), composer
Coral Atkins (1936–2016), actress, known for A Family at War and Emmerdale.
Chris Tarrant (born 1946) OBE, TV and radio presenter
Carole Middleton (born 1955), mother of Catherine, Princess of Wales, Pippa Middleton (born 1983), and James William Middleton (born 1987)
Catherine, Princess of Wales (born 1982), wife of William, Prince of Wales, heir to the British throne

References

External links

Bucklebury Parish Council Broken link
The Bucklebury Bowl Turners

 
Villages in Berkshire
Civil parishes in Berkshire
West Berkshire District